George Thomson was a Scottish rugby union player. He was the 96th President of the Scottish Rugby Union.

Rugby Union career

Amateur career

He played for Watsonians. He played sevens for Watsonians in the 1946 Jed-Forest Sevens.

He played for a Scottish Services XV in 1944.

Administrative career

Thomson became the 96th President of the Scottish Rugby Union. He served the standard one year from 1982 to 1983.

Military career

He was a sub-Lieutenant in the Second World War. He won a Distinguished Service Cross for his work on Arctic convoys.

Death

Thomson died in 2005.

Jim Telfer described Thomson as 'the father of (rugby union) coaching in Scotland'. He went to say:
We lost a great man when George died in 2005. It was his enthusiasm of developing a professional, cutting edge to rugby coaching that inspired me. Intriguingly he was fanatical about the development of the ruck as part of the Scottish armoury and, believe it or not, occasionally I had to dampen down his enthusiasm.

References

2005 deaths
Scottish rugby union players
Presidents of the Scottish Rugby Union
Watsonians RFC players
Rugby union hookers